The Comox Valley Regional District is a regional district in British Columbia, Canada.  It was created on February 15, 2008, encompassing the southeastern portions of the former Regional District of Comox-Strathcona, and centred about the Comox Valley. The partition left the new Comox Valley Regional District with only 8.4 percent of the former Comox-Strathcona's land area, but 57.9 percent of its population. The CVRD covers an area of 2,425 square kilometres, of which 1,725 square kilometres is land (the remainder is water), and serves a population of 66,527 according to the 2016 Census. The district borders the Strathcona Regional District to the northwest, the Alberni-Clayoquot Regional District to the southwest, and the Regional District of Nanaimo to the southeast, as well as the Powell River Regional District along the Strait of Georgia to the east.

Two Indian reserves, K'omoks Indian Reserve No. 1 and Puntledge Indian Reserve No. 2 lie within its territory but are outside its jurisdiction. The census divisions comprising the new Regional District are the city of Courtenay, the town of Comox, the village of Cumberland, the district of Black Creek, Electoral Areas A, B, and C, and the two stated Indian reserves.

The administrative offices are in Courtenay, British Columbia.

Demographics 

Note: Totals greater than 100% due to multiple origin responses.

Incorporated communities
Town of Comox
City of Courtenay
Village of Cumberland

Unincorporated communities

Comox Valley A
Known as the Baynes Sound-Denman/Hornby Islands electoral area, this electoral area includes the southern portion of the district, on the border with the Alberni-Clayoquot and Nanaimo Regional Districts.

According to the 2016 Canada Census:
Population: 7,293
% Change (2011-2016): 4.5%
Dwellings: 4,360
Area (km²): 491.99
Density (persons per km²): 14.7

Communities
Denman Island
Fanny Bay
Hornby Island
Royston
Union Bay

Comox Valley B

Known as the Lazo North electoral area, this electoral area surrounds the town of Comox.  It has no administrative or governmental function and is used only to select rural representatives to the regional district board.

According to the 2016 Census:
Population: 7,095 (exclusive of any on-Indian Reserve residents)
% Change (2011–2016): 2.2%
Dwellings: 3,026
Area (km²): 54.28
Density (persons per km²): 117.9

Communities
Balmoral Beach
Bates Beach
Grantham
Lazo
Little River
Sandwick

Comox Valley C

Known as the Puntledge/Black Creek electoral area, it is located between Courtenay, Campbell River and Strathcona Provincial Park.

According to the 2016 Census:
Population: 8,617 (exclusive of any residents of Indian Reserves)
% Change (2011–2016): 3.5%
Dwellings: 3,572
Area (km²): 1073.96	
Density (persons per km²): 7.1

Communities
Bevan
Black Creek
Headquarters
Merville
Mount Washington
Puntledge
Saratoga Beach
Williams Beach

Transit

Comox Valley Transit is the regional public transportation system, operated by Watson and Ash Transportation. Funding is provided under a partnership between the region and BC Transit, the provincial agency which plans and manages municipal transit systems.

See also
Mount Geoffrey Regional Nature Park

Notes

References

External links

 
Regional districts of British Columbia